Fly with the Crane is a 2012 Chinese film written and directed by Li Ruijun, and adapted from a novel Tell Them I've Gone With the White Crane by renowned Chinese author Su Tong. It made its premiere at the 69th Venice International Film Festival in 2012.

Synopsis
Old Ma (Ma Xingchun), a 73-year-old carpenter, used to make and paint coffins. Believing that a person's soul and spirit can only be preserved after death through burial, he plans to make a romantic ending of his life and longs to be taken to heaven by a white crane.

After the Chinese authorities implemented cremation, Old Ma feels hopeless until one day, when his grandchildren maps out an extraordinary plan to set him free.

Cast
 Ma Xingchun as Old Ma
 Tang Long as Zhi 
 Wang Siyi as Miaomiao
 Zhang Min as Ma Chunhua, Old Ma's daughter
 Wu Renlin as Zhi's father
 Wang Cailan as Zhi's mother
 Wang Zhihang as Jun
 Wang Dazhi as Old Cao
 Li Shengjun as Old Cao's son

Production
The cast of Fly with the Crane is all by Director Li's families, relatives and friends.

Awards and nominations

References

External links
 
 

2012 films
Chinese drama films
2010s Mandarin-language films
Films directed by Li Ruijun